Robert Howard Pierson (3 January 1911 – 21 January 1989) was a president of the General Conference of Seventh-day Adventists during the 12 1/2-year period June 16, 1966, to January 3, 1979. While in the line of duty, Pierson  served in North America, Asia and Africa. He interacted with 3 U.S. Presidents and the Presidents or Prime Ministers of 8 foreign countries, plus many governors, mayors, and other governmental dignitaries. He received an Honorary Doctor of Divinity degree from Andrews University, Berrien Springs, Michigan in the United States. As of 2018, Pierson is the third longest-serving church president after A. G. Daniels, and James Lamar McElhany.

Biography 
After graduating from Southern Junior College, Collegedale, Tennessee, in August 1933, Pierson’s first assignment was a pastor-teacher position in the Columbus and Albany churches in southwestern Georgia. From there he was transferred to the Home Missionary Department of the Georgia-Cumberland Conference. In 1935, the Pierson family began a seven-year term of service in India, first as pastor of the Bombay English-speaking church, then as superintendent of the Tamil Mission in south India, and president of the South India Union Mission in Bangalore. In 1939, while in India, he was ordained as a minister of the Adventist church. In 1942 during the Second World War, Pierson returned to the United States with his family where he served as pastor of the Seventh-day Adventist Church in Takoma Park, Maryland. From there he moved to New York City where he was the speaker of the nightly program Bible Auditorium of the Air over a 50,000-watt commercial station. Pierson’s next assignment was in the Inter-American Division where he served as president of the British West Indies Union (1944-1947)in Mandeville, Jamaica; president of the Caribbean Union (1947-1950) in Port of Spain, Trinidad. In 1950 he became president of the Southern Asia Division (1950–1954), in Pune, India. In 1954 he returned to the United States and served as president of the Kentucky-Tennessee Conference (1954–1957), in Nashville, Tennessee, and president of the Texas Conference (1957–1958), in Fort Worth, Texas. In 1958 he was transferred to Africa where he became president of the Southern Africa Division (1958–1962), and the Trans-African Division (1962–1966), both in Harare, Zimbabwe; and ultimately, president of the General Conference (1966–1979) in Takoma Park, Washington, D.C. Aside from busy administrative assignments, Pierson’s love for evangelism led him to conduct evangelistic meetings as often as his schedule permitted.

Personal Information 

Pierson was born January 3, 1911, in Brooklyn, Iowa, US. He completed his secondary education at Summerfield Highschool in Summerfield, Florida, his tertiary studies were completed at Southern Junior College in Collegedale Tennessee in 1933. He married Dollis Mae Smith of Ocala, Florida in 1931. They have two sons, John D. Pierson and Robert G. Pierson. He died January 21, 1989, in Kailua, Hawaii, while serving as the interim pastor of the Kailua SDA Church.

Publications 

Pierson was a prolific writer, both of prose and poetry. His biography Radiant With Hope lists him as author of 28 books, many of them translated into multiple languages, as well as hundreds of articles. He wrote many stories and devotional works. Journals, such as the Youth Instructor, a journal for Adventist youth (now discontinued), published his essays. In 1955, a seven part series entitled Forbidden Lands and Strange Places, Pierson described his travel to Afghanistan.

Books published 
 1948. The road to happiness
 1948. Wonderful Jesus
 1951. Triumphs of the cross in lands afar
 1953. Paddles over the Kamarang; the story of the Davis Indians with  Joseph O Emmerson
 1958. The secret of happiness
 1959. Give us this day
 1965. 501 Adventist illustrations and stories
 1966. So, you want to be a leader! : a spiritual, human relations and promotional approach to church leadership and administration
 1966. The final countdown with G  S Stevenson
 1966. What shall I speak about? : 250 suggestions and helps in preparing talks and sermons for many occasions
 1967. Faith on tiptoe; glimpses into the simple dynamics of practical Christian living
 1968. Though the winds blow; a daily guide to successful living
 1968. Road to true riches. [On interpreting the Bible. With plates.]
 1970. Heart to heart
 1974. Revival and reformation
 1974. Faith triumphant
 1975. We still believe
 1975. Angels Over Elisabethville: A True Story of God's Providence in Time of War
 1976. Good-bye, planet Earth
 1977. In step with Jesus
 1978. How to become a successful Christian leader
 1978. What's just ahead with Don Short
 1978. Beloved leaders : inspirational essays on Seventh-Day Adventist Christian leadership
 1983. Miracles happen every day
 1984. Here comes adventure
 1987. Love come home
 1989. The role of the spirit of prophecy in preparing God's people for earth's final events with Ellen G. White Estate, Inc.

See also

 General Conference of Seventh-day Adventists
 Seventh-day Adventist Church
 Seventh-day Adventist theology
 Seventh-day Adventist eschatology
 History of the Seventh-day Adventist Church

External links 
 Seventh-day Adventist Periodical Index (SDAPI) search for articles by Pierson
 One of Pierson's sermons

References 

Seventh-day Adventist administrators
1911 births
1989 deaths
American Seventh-day Adventists
Seventh-day Adventist religious workers
American Seventh-day Adventist ministers
History of the Seventh-day Adventist Church
Editors of Christian publications